Wrist is a municipality in the district of Steinburg, in Schleswig-Holstein, Germany.

Geography 
Wrist is situated 2 kilometres south east of Kellinghusen and Wrist station is on the main railway line from Hamburg to Kiel. The  passes Wrist. It is connected with the Bundesautobahn 7 in the east. The next airport is Hamburg Airport.

References

Steinburg